The following is a list of the MuchMusic Video Awards winners for Best Cinematography.

MuchMusic Video Awards